Cora schizophylloides is a species of basidiolichen in the family Hygrophoraceae. Found in Colombia, it was formally described as a new species in 2016 by Bibiana Moncada, Camillo Rodríguez, and Robert Lücking. The specific epithet schizophylloides alludes to the resemblance of the dried lichen thallus with the fruitbody of the fungus Schizophyllum commune. The lichen is only known from the type locality, where it grows as an epiphyte on páramo shrubs. The terrestrial species Cora hirsuta is closely related.

References

schizophylloides
Lichen species
Lichens described in 2016
Lichens of Colombia
Taxa named by Robert Lücking
Basidiolichens